New Alipore College, established in 1963, is an undergraduate college in Kolkata, West Bengal, India. It is affiliated with the University of Calcutta. The college campus is free from posters and plastic. The college is the seat of higher studies in the region. The college has been visited by a range of people from historians to poets, and journalists to educationists, like John Thieme (UK), Sekhar Bandyopadhyay (NZ), Ranabir Chakravorty (JNU), Alessandro Vescovi, Università degli Studi di Milano - State University of Milan (Italy), Subodh Sarkar, Binayak Bandyopadhya, Sanjukta Dasgupta, Anjum Katyal, Sharmila Ray, Snehasis Sur, Gopali Banerjee, Gopal Chandra Mishra (VC, Gourbonga University), Prof.  Malashri Lal, Prof. Bashabi Fraser, noted poet Keki N Daruwalla, Nalini Bera, Ashok Sengupta (Kalyani Univ), Dr Siddhartha Biswas and Dalit activist and author Manohar Mouli Biswas.

Sri Aroop Biswas (Honorable MIC, Government of West Bengal) is the president of the governing body and an alumnus of the college. Jaydeep Sarangi, an academician and bilingual poet, is the current principal of the college. The college has taken active role in online education via Learning Management System though the website. It takes care of mental well-being of its stakeholders.

Vision: 
Include, Ignite and Innovate

Departments

Science
Chemistry
Physics
Mathematics
Computer Science
Botany
Zoology
Anthropology
Electronics

Arts and Commerce
Bengali
English
Education
Sanskrit
History
Geography
Political Science
Philosophy
Economics
Journalism and Mass Communication
Commerce

Accreditation
New Alipore College is recognized by the University Grants Commission. Recently, it has been re-accredited and awarded B+ grade by the National Assessment and Accreditation Council. It is an ISO 9001 certified Institution (2019).

See also 
List of colleges affiliated to the University of Calcutta
Education in India
Education in West Bengal

References

External links
www.newaliporecollege.in
www.epaper.thestatesman.com/c/38151239
www.epaper.prabhatkhabar.com/2107010/KOLKATA-City/kol-city#page/5/1
www.epaper.telegraphindia.com/calcutta/2019-05-28/71/Page-19.html

Educational institutions established in 1963
University of Calcutta affiliates
Universities and colleges in Kolkata
1963 establishments in West Bengal